Brawler, or Beat 'em up, is a video game genre featuring hand-to-hand combat between the protagonist and an improbably large number of opponents. 

Brawler(s) may also refer to:

Brawler, a 2011 American action drama film
Mukkabaaz (The Brawler), a 2017 Indian sports drama film
Mii Brawler, a playable character in Super Smash Bros. for Nintendo 3DS and Wii U and Super Smash Bros. Ultimate
Playable characters in the video game Brawl Stars

People
Brawlers (band), an English punk rock group
The Barroom Brawlers, a professional wrestling tag team from the United States Wrestling Association
"The Brooklyn Brawler", stage name for American professional wrestler Steve Lombardi (born 1961)

See also

Bakugan Battle Brawlers
Brawl (disambiguation)